The Vinoř Cricket Ground is a cricket ground in Vinoř, Prague, the first cricket ground in the Czech Republic. The ground opened in 2012, with a second pitch being added in 2014 due to funding from the International Cricket Council (ICC). In April 2021, the ground was confirmed as the venue for the 2021 Central Europe Cup, a  Twenty20 International (T20I) cricket tournament.

References

Sports venues in Prague